Irving Braxiatel or Cardinal Braxiatel is a fictional character from the Virgin New Adventures—spin-off novels based on the BBC science fiction television series Doctor Who. He subsequently became a regular character in novels and audio dramas in the Bernice Summerfield series. In the Big Finish Productions audio dramas he is voiced by Miles Richardson. He is also stated to be the older brother of the Doctor.

The New and Missing Adventures
Braxiatel, a Time Lord, first appeared in the novel Theatre of War by Justin Richards, although the Fourth Doctor's companion Romana mentions the Braxiatel Collection in passing in the 1979 television serial City of Death. In terms of the Doctor's timeline, their first portrayed meeting was in the Virgin Missing Adventures First Doctor novel The Empire of Glass by Andy Lane, although they already knew each other. Braxiatel met the Seventh Doctor in Theatre of War and was also at the wedding of Bernice "Benny" Summerfield and Jason Kane in Happy Endings by Paul Cornell.

The Braxiatel Collection — renowned for being one of the greatest art galleries in the galaxy — was founded by Irving Braxiatel and located on an asteroid which Braxiatel was rumoured to have won by playing cards. It had extensive archaeological libraries which could be used with Braxiatel's permission. Braxiatel's collection of books contained every book banned by the Catholic church; he most likely acquired these from the Library of St. John the Beheaded in England, which he founded (as mentioned at the end of The Empire of Glass). The Library of St. John was featured in the New Adventure All-Consuming Fire by Andy Lane and the Missing Adventure Millennial Rites by Craig Hinton.

In The Empire of Glass, Braxiatel became involved with galactic politics. He organised the Armageddon Convention, which he tried to get the Doctor to chair, but by mistake his agents brought a physically similar man. The Convention was not particularly successful, although we know that it did outlaw the use of cyberbombs (Revenge of the Cybermen). Braxiatel decided to go back to collecting.

At some point, Braxiatel became the head of the Department of Theatrology at St. Oscar's University on Dellah. After Benny obtained a post at the archaeology department in 2593, the pair of them became entangled in many adventures.  After the destruction of the planet Dellah, Braxiatel invited Benny to join him at the Braxiatel Collection.

The Bernice Summerfield novel Tears of the Oracle by Justin Richards suggests that Braxiatel is the Doctor's brother and the fact he had left Gallifrey and gone out into the universe was one of the factors that motivated the Doctor to leave. Certainly in the short story "Be Forgot" the Doctor leaves Braxiatel a Christmas present of a pair of socks, signed 'Thete', indicating that their relationship goes back to the days on Gallifrey when the Doctor was called Theta Sigma. In the audio play 100, the Sixth Doctor comments that "Brax" was always the sensible one. How this fits with novels such as Lungbarrow, which establishes that the Time Lords are sterile and do not have conventional families, but are created by genetic looms, is unclear.

Gallifrey
Braxiatel also appears, as Cardinal Braxiatel, in the Doctor Who audio drama Zagreus and in the spin-off series Gallifrey. In these stories, which are set prior to the Bernice Summerfield stories in Braxiatel's timeline, he is a member of the High Council of Time Lords and a confidante of President Romana.

In Gallifrey: The Inquiry, it was revealed that the disastrous test of a timeonic fusion device which destroyed the planet Minyos prompted Braxiatel to begin collecting and preserving historical artifacts in case such widespread destruction ever happened. He also admitted that he had transgressed the Laws of Time by being in contact with his future regenerations.

In Gallifrey: Pandora, Braxiatel became Chancellor, but mere hours later had to use his mind to contain the past and present forms of an ancient Gallifreyan evil known as Pandora. As Pandora would be able to escape if he ever connected to the Matrix or telepathically communicated with another Time Lord mind, Braxiatel exiled himself from Gallifrey.

In Gallifrey: Warfare Romana destroyed the future form of Pandora (as well as its intelligence), at the cost of also destroying the Matrix.  When Romana was removed from office in Gallifrey: Mindbomb, Braxiatel returned briefly to Gallifrey and assumed the post of Lord President, since there was no longer anywhere for the Pandora entity to escape to.

However, the ambitious Inquisitor Darkel goaded Braxiatel into losing control of Pandora, believing that it would destroy itself and Braxiatel's mind in the process. Braxiatel then revealed that only a remnant of the entity had ever been in his mind; the bulk of it had sought refuge in Darkel and Braxiatel had merely been the key that kept it restrained. So freed, Pandora consumed both Darkel and itself. Braxiatel returned to his exile, retaining the last fragments of Pandora within him.

However, Braxiatel was not done: hearing rumors of an impending threat against Gallifrey and deciding that in its weakened state the planet was doomed, he hatched a scheme to preserve the Time Lord biodata archive, containing the genetic patterns of all Time Lords, past and present, in the hopes of reconstructing Gallifrey after its inevitable fall. By the end of Gallifrey: Panacea, Gallifrey is on the brink of economic and social collapse as well as in danger of being overrun by a virus created by the terrorist organization Free Time.  He had taken Romana, Leela, K9 II and the Time Lord's biodata bank out of time, in order to restore Gallifrey in the future.  There, they find themselves unable to reenter normal space and time, but they can explore Gallifreys in alternate universes.  In Gallifrey: Disassembled, he gets into an altercation with an alternate version of the Doctor.  He's thrown into the time lines, seemingly lost forever.  But in fact, he returns home, where he immediately meets Bernice Summerfield for the first time.  This story also continues the implication that he is related to the Doctor, and further implies that he encouraged the Doctor to leave Gallifrey in the first place because the Time Lords wanted to kill him.

Bernice Summerfield audios
Big Finish's series of Bernice Summerfield books and audios have brought Bernice to the Braxiatel Collection, with Braxiatel himself becoming a key part of the regular cast. He is aloof and mysterious but is still considered one of Benny's closest friends.

A conspiracy started to develop around Braxiatel, first occurring in the audio The Mirror Effect. While all the characters were shown dark, twisted mirror images of themselves, Braxiatel was unaffected and when Jason Kane wondered if the real Braxiatel was the mirror version, Jason was brainwashed into being unable to be suspicious of Braxiatel. Further incidents showed the Time Lord to be secretly more dangerous and manipulative than he was letting on — in the book A Life in Pieces, he was shown using a brainwashed Jason for his own ends as well as having murder done in his name and causing a civil war in the Domus system. The other characters remained unaware of any of this.

Braxiatel was finally caught out when, following the Collection's occupation by the Fifth Axis and their Dalek masters, he decided to ensure the Collection would survive by finding an army to defend it. He turned to the colony of Cantus, which had been taken over long ago by the Cybermen, and had a member of the Collection, Ronan McGinley, turned into a Cyber-Controller subordinate to Braxiatel's will. Using a mysterious Gallifreyan crystal, Ronan was able to make all the Cybermen follow Braxiatel's orders. In the audio adventure, The Crystal of Cantus it was revealed that the crystal was slowly killing Ronan, so Braxiatel arranged for Jason to arrive on Cantus to become the new Controller. Thanks to Benny, this plan backfired and Jason remembered everything that Braxiatel had done to him. Braxiatel then left the Collection.  Before he left, the last words Ronan McGinley spoke were, "The thing in your head... it's still there...", hinting that Pandora is still active.

Braxiatel turned up again in The Tub Full of Cats, in which he returned to the Collection to negotiate an agreement that would prevent war between the Draconians and the Mim.  Later, in the audio The End of the World (not to be confused with the Doctor Who episode of the same name), Jason Kane confronted him for the things he had done to him, Benny, and their friends.  It was during this confrontation, that partly due to Brax's own manipulations, but partly also by accident, Jason was killed.  Benny soon learns of Brax's role in Jason's death, and in The Wake she flees from him.

Braxiatel soon reveals that Benny plays a critical role in his plans, and lures her into a trap.  She is freed from this trap in Resurrecting the Past, which directly follows the animated short Dead and Buried.  This version of Braxiatel finally meets his maker in Escaping the Future.

From Judgement Day onwards, an alternative version of Braxiatel has appeared, claiming to be the version from the Gallifrey continuity.  The exact nature of the relationship between these and other hinted at versions of Braxiatel is currently unknown.

Braxiatel is voiced by actor Miles Richardson, whose interpretation of the role has influenced the changing nature of the character.

External links

Literary characters introduced in 1994
Bernice Summerfield
Doctor Who audio characters
Doctor Who book characters
Male characters in literature
Time Lords